Carlos Bustamante may refer to:
 Carlos Bustamante (biophysicist)
 Carlos D. Bustamante, population geneticist 
 Carlos Bustamante (TV personality)
 Carlos Bustamante (baseball)